The Battle of Fort Erie was a surrounding and forcing of the Fenian armies surrender following a skirmish near Fort Erie and the farther away Battle of Ridgeway on June 2, 1866. The Fenian force, withdrawing from Ridgeway, met a small force of Canadian militia at Fort Erie, then known as the village of Waterloo.

Battle 
In response to the Fenian occupation of the township of Fort Erie, Ontario on the night of June 1, 1866, militia units throughout the Niagara Peninsula had been mobilized or put on alert. At Port Colborne, a detachment of 51 gunners and N.C.O.s, British Royal Artillery bombardier Sergeant James McCracken and 3 officers (Captain Richard S. King M.D., Lieutenants A.K. Schofield and Charles Nimmo [Nemmo]) taken under command by Lieutenant-Colonel John Dennis, boarded a tugboat, the W.T. Robb carrying the Dunnville Naval Brigade, consisting of 19 men and 3 officers (Captain Lachlan McCallum, Lieutenant Walter T. Robb, Second Lieutenant Angus Macdonald) (a total of 71 men and 8 officers) and steamed east to the Niagara River, then scouted downriver as far as Black Creek. The Welland Field Battery did not have its four Armstrong guns with it, and only half were armed with Enfield muzzle-loading rifles, with the other half armed with obsolete smooth-bore "Victoria" carbines that had a limited range of approximately 300 yards at best.

Thinking the Fenians were gone, Canadian volunteers turned back upriver to secure the village of Fort Erie and deny them an escape route. A company of the Welland Field Battery landed without difficulty, capturing around 59 of the Fenian movements soldiers. But when John O'Neill returned with most of his large army from the nearby Ridgeway, the small number of Canadian volunteers that were sent to capture a small numbers of Fenian soldiers were not prepared. A firefight followed, in which the militia and sailors were outnumbered by Fenian soldiers causing most of the Canadian volunteers to surrender.
The remaining Canadian volunteers on the gunboat went back to Port Colborne to inform of the situation while O'Neill the Fenian soldiers stayed in Fort Erie. Later, an estimated 5,000 Canadian militia reinforcements informed of the situation came and surrounded the Fenian movement’s army in Fort Erie. Causing O'Neill to retreat back to New York State. Some Fenians chose to desert, crossing the river on a variety of stolen or improvised craft. The remainder, 850 in number, crossed in a body and surrendered to a U.S. naval party from  near Buffalo, putting an end to Fenian incursions along the Niagara Peninsula.

See also
List of conflicts in Canada

References

Further reading

 Vronsky, Peter Ridgeway: The American Fenian Invasion and the 1866 Battle That Made Canada., Toronto:  Penguin Canada-Allen Lane, 2011.

External links
Ridgeway: The American Fenian Invasion and the 1866 Battle That Made Canada, Peter Vronsky
Fenians.org

Fort Erie
Fort Erie 1866
Fort Erie
1866 in Ontario
June 1866 events
History of the Regional Municipality of Niagara